The 2017 Guzzini Challenger was a professional tennis tournament played on hard courts. It was the fifteenth edition of the tournament which was part of the 2017 ATP Challenger Tour. It took place in Recanati, Italy between 3 and 9 July 2017.

Singles main-draw entrants

Seeds

 1 Rankings are as of 26 June 2017.

Other entrants
The following players received wildcards into the singles main draw:
  Edoardo Eremin
  Gianluca Mager
  Julian Ocleppo
  Andrea Vavassori

The following players received entry from the qualifying draw:
  Altuğ Çelikbilek
  Viktor Galović
  Evgeny Karlovskiy
  Frederik Nielsen

Champions

Singles

  Viktor Galović def.  Mirza Bašić 7–6(7–3), 6–4.

Doubles

  Jonathan Eysseric /  Quentin Halys def.  Julian Ocleppo /  Andrea Vavassori 6–7(3–7), 6–4, [12–10].

External links
Official Website

Guzzini Challenger
2017
2017 in Italian tennis